Nuevo Polanco (English, "New Polanco") is an area of Mexico City formerly consisting of warehouses and factories, bordering the upscale Polanco on the north across Avenida Ejército Nacional. Officially it consists of two colonias, Granada and Ampliación Granada.

This area is undergoing an accelerated process of re-conversion and development. With a major transformation taking place, it is one of the fastest and most important real estate development areas in the country. Taking advantage of their now prime location, big pieces of land originally occupied mainly by industries are being used to build large housing, office, commercial and cultural developments with shops, restaurants, cinemas, museums, a 1,500-seat theater, a luxury hotel, etc. Many of them integrate in their name the word 'Polanco' thus seeking to capitalize on its reputation.

In October 2013, the Secretariat of Urban Development and Housing (SEDUVI) put a stop to further development until a master plan for dealing with the infrastructure problems was approved. At that time the population of Nuevo Polanco was 76,000, twice as high as originally foreseen, with 23,469 housing units. Nuevo Polanco had gained attention in the international press as an example of how development can go wrong if there is no proper planning for infrastructure.

The area has now largely been converted into new shopping and mixed-use developments. These include:
Acuario Inbursa, Mexico's largest aquarium, opened in June 2014
 Antara Polanco a fashionable shopping and restaurants center, built on the land previously occupied by a  General Motors de Mexico car assembly plant
 Plaza Carso, a large cultural, commercial, office and living complex owned by Carlos Slim, built on the land formerly occupied by General Popo-General Tire battery and tire plant. The total cost of the complex is quoted between USD 800 million and 1.4 billion. The complex claims to be the largest mixed-use development in Latin America and includes the following components:
Museo Soumaya, owned by the Carlos Slim Foundation. The museum contains the Slim's extensive art, religious relic, historical document, and coin collection. The museum holds works by many of the best known European artists from the 15th to the 20th century including a large collection of casts of sculptures by Auguste Rodin. The building is a shiny silver cloud-like structure reminiscent of a Rodin sculpture.
 Museo Júmex, opening November 2013, to house part of the Colección Jumex, the contemporary art collection of the Jumex juice company.
 Plaza Carso shopping center, featuring an  Saks Fifth Avenue store, the second to have opened in Mexico. Together with the atrium this section measures . 
Teatro Cervantes theater, seating 1500
 Residential towers: Torre Dalí, Torre Monet and Torre Rodin
Office towers,  two of 23 floors each, and one of 20 floors. The three buildings are joined on the lower 3 levels by an atrium and the shopping center. The towers are: Torre Telcel - the headquarters of América Móvil are here; Torre Falcon, and Torre Zurich.
Miyana, one of the largest mixed-use developments in the city, consisting of apartment buildings, a VIP Cinepolis, several stores and tens of restaurants and eating places. 
Grand Polanco, developed on the land previously occupied by a Chrysler franchise 
Parques Polanco, first occupied by Fábricas Automex, a Chrysler car assembly plant
Portika Polanco
Ventanas Polanco 
Terret Polanco (office complex, under construction), located in land previously used by a factory producing yeast  
Polarea, located on the grounds until recently occupied the plant of Vitro, a glass factory.
Alto Polanco (apartments, under construction), on the grounds previously housing the H. Steele y Compañía office furniture factory (formerly the Cia. Hulera Euzkadi tire plant)

The new headquarters of the United States Embassy in Mexico will be located in New Polanco, a large complex to be built on land previously used for a Colgate-Palmolive plant.

References

External links
  Ramírez, Kenya. "Alistan plan maestro para Nuevo Polanco." El Exelsior. June 1, 2014.

Miguel Hidalgo, Mexico City
Neighborhoods in Mexico City
Mixed-use developments in Mexico
Shopping districts and streets in Mexico